The 1994 Air Canada Cup was Canada's 16th annual national midget 'AAA' hockey championship, which was played April 18 – 24, 1994 at the Keystone Centre in Brandon, Manitoba.  The Regina Pat Canadians defeated the Red Deer Chiefs in double overtime of the gold medal game to win the national title. The Intrépide de Gatineau won the bronze medal game. Daniel Brière of Gatineau led the tournament in scoring, while Chris Mason of Red Deer was named Top Goaltender.

Teams

Round robin

Standings

Scores

Sudbury 5 - Brandon 2
Regina 3 - Gatineau 2
Red Deer 6 - Halifax 5
Gatineau 5 - Brandon 3
Sudbury 5 - Halifax 4
Regina 5 - Brandon 1
Red Deer 4 - Sudbury 1
Halifax 7 - Gatineau 6
Sudbury 4 - Regina 3
Red Deer 5 - Brandon 1
Regina 4 - Halifax 3
Gatineau 7 - Sudbury 3
Red Deer 4 - Regina 2
Halifax 5 - Brandon 4
Gatineau 7 - Red Deer 2

Playoffs

Semi-finals
Red Deer 5 - Sudbury 1
Regina 3 - Gatineau 1

Bronze-medal game
Gatineau 5 - Sudbury 1

Gold-medal game
Regina 3 - Red Deer 2 2OT

Individual awards
Most Valuable Player: Tyler Barabonoff (Red Deer)
Top Scorer: Daniel Brière (Gatineau)
Top Forward: Daniel Brière (Gatineau)
Top Defenceman: Tyler Barabonoff (Red Deer)
Top Goaltender: Chris Mason (Red Deer)
Most Sportsmanlike Player: Joel Irving (Regina)

See also
Telus Cup

References

External links
Telus Cup Website
Hockey Canada-Telus Cup Guide and Record Book

Telus Cup
Air Canada Cup
Air Canada Cup
April 1994 sports events in Canada
1994 in Manitoba